Brussels Peak is a  mountain summit located in the Athabasca River valley of Jasper National Park, in the Canadian Rockies of Alberta, Canada. The nearest higher peak is Mount Fryatt,  to the northwest. Brussels Peak can be seen from the Icefields Parkway.

Brussels Peak was named after the ship SS Brussels.


Climate

Based on the Köppen climate classification, Brussels Peak is located in a subarctic climate with cold, snowy winters, and mild summers.

See also
Geography of Alberta

References

External links
 Parks Canada web site: Jasper National Park

Three-thousanders of Alberta
Mountains of Jasper National Park